Uladzimir Makowski (born 23 April 1977) is a Belarusian football coach and former player.

Career

Match Fixing
In August 2016, while assistant manager at Isloch Minsk Raion, Makowski was alleged to have been involved in fixing a match with Dinamo Brest on 30 April 2016, along with Alyaksandr Lebedzew, Alyaksandr Tsishkevich, Aleksandr Budakov, Aleksandr Alumona and Andrey Paryvayew. On 20 February 2018, the BFF, having found him guilty of match-fixing, banned him from football for life.

Personal life
He is the twin brother of Mihail Makowski.

Azerbaijan Career statistics

Honours

Club
Dinamo Minsk
 Belarusian Premier League champion: 1997

Dynamo Kyiv
 Ukrainian Premier League champion: 1997–98, 1998–99
 Ukrainian Cup winner: 1997–98, 1998–99

Naftan Novopolotsk
 Belarusian Cup winner: 2008–09

Individual
 CIS Cup top goalscorer: 1996
 Belarusian Footballer of the Year: 1996

References

External links
 Profile at kick-off.by

1977 births
Living people
Association football forwards
Belarusian footballers
Belarus international footballers
Belarusian expatriate footballers
Expatriate footballers in Ukraine
Expatriate footballers in Russia
Expatriate footballers in Azerbaijan
Belarusian expatriate sportspeople in Ukraine
Belarusian expatriate sportspeople in Russia
Belarusian expatriate sportspeople in Azerbaijan
Belarusian twins
Twin sportspeople
Belarusian Premier League players
Ukrainian Premier League players
FC Molodechno players
FC Dinamo Minsk players
FC Dynamo Kyiv players
FC Dynamo-2 Kyiv players
FC Baltika Kaliningrad players
FC Vorskla Poltava players
FC CSKA Kyiv players
FC Hoverla Uzhhorod players
FC Torpedo Minsk players
Shamakhi FK players
FC Darida Minsk Raion players
FC Naftan Novopolotsk players
FC Granit Mikashevichi players
FC Gorodeya players
FC Isloch Minsk Raion players